Nuria Benzal Andaloussi (born 3 April 1985) is a Spanish handball player who most recently played for Üsküdar Belediyespor and formerly was a member of the Spanish women's national team.

Benzal was part of the Spanish team at the 2008 European Women's Handball Championship, where the Spanish team reached the final, after defeating Germany in the semifinal.

References

External links
 

1985 births
Living people
People from Estepona
Sportspeople from the Province of Málaga
Spanish female handball players
Expatriate handball players
Spanish expatriate sportspeople in Serbia
Spanish expatriate sportspeople in Hungary
Spanish expatriate sportspeople in Turkey
Competitors at the 2013 Mediterranean Games
Mediterranean Games competitors for Spain
Competitors at the 2009 Mediterranean Games
21st-century Spanish women
20th-century Spanish women